On 3 June 2022, a double decker regional train derailed north of Garmisch-Partenkirchen, near  on the Munich–Garmisch-Partenkirchen railway in southern Germany. Five people died and 68 passengers were injured, 16 of them seriously.

Derailment 

Five passenger carriages derailed at a curve near Loisachauen in the Burgrain district of Garmisch-Partenkirchen, heading north between Garmisch-Partenkirchen station and Farchant station. The electric locomotive was at the rear of the push–pull train configuration. The derailment occurred at milestone position , as measured from Munich.

Three overhead line supports were knocked over in the accident, while 500 sleepers and 700 m of track were so badly damaged that they had to be replaced.  Three of the double-deck coaches had to be written off.

Soldiers travelling on board the train were able to provide first aid.  The location of the derailment right next to a main road allowed emergency vehicles to be brought in quickly.  Six rescue helicopters attended.  Lightly injured people were taken to a local building for care.  Train services were suspended between Oberau station and Garmisch-Partenkirchen station.

Five people were killed. Two of them were refugees from Ukraine. The accident took place on the last Friday before the Pentecost holiday, meaning there were many children on the train.

Victims 
Five people died in the accident: a 13-year-old boy from the Garmisch-Partenkirchen district, a 51-year-old woman from Wiesbaden, a 70-year-old woman from the Munich district and two Ukrainian women, aged 30 and 39, who had fled the war in their homeland. 

In the first nine days after the accident, there were reportedly 44 injured, of whom 15 were seriously injured;  the police later updated this. As of 12 June, 16 people were reportedly seriously injured, while 52 had suffered less grievous injuries.

Investigation 
The Federal Authority for Railway Accident Investigation (Bundesstelle für Eisenbahnunfalluntersuchung, or BEU) began an investigation into the course of events later on the same day as the accident. The Weilheim police service established a special commission with some 50 members, working under the "Munich II" Public Prosecution Service, to review any application of criminal law to the accident. The commission was named "Soko Zug", the former word being a contraction of "Sonderkommission" ("special commission") and the latter the German word for "train". Further, the Prosecution Service assigned an independent external consultant to prepare an expert report analyzing the accident. The train was seized for examination; early on, the bogies underwent close inspection. A length of a few hundred metres of rail southwards from the derailment site was dismantled for the investigation and likewise secured. The bogies and wrecked coaches stored nearby have since been under police guard, as were the locomotive and the last coaches still left on the track before they were taken away. The investigation quickly came to focus on the rails and the bogies, with concentration on technical defects. Even the earliest investigation, according to police information, showed that the permitted speed limit at the accident site had been observed.

On 7 June, the "Munich II" Public Prosecution Service announced that it had begun preliminary proceedings against three Deutsche Bahn employees on the grounds of reasonable suspicion of negligent homicide. The three employees in question were the traffic controller who was on duty that day at the Weilheim control centre, the locomotive driver and the one responsible for the permanent way along the stretch of line where the accident happened.

See also
 Garmisch-Partenkirchen train collision, a different rail accident, in 1995.

References

2022 in Germany
2022 disasters in Germany
2020s in Bavaria
Accidents and incidents involving Deutsche Bahn
Derailments in Germany
Train derailment
June 2022 events in Germany
Railway accidents in 2022